The 1935 Singapore Open, also known as the 1935 Singapore Badminton Championships, took place from 13 July – 15 September 1935 at the Clerical Union Hall in Balestier, Singapore. The ties were played over a few months with the first round ties being played on the 13th of July and the last (men's singles final) was played on the 15th of September. There were no women's singles and doubles competitions being held due to the lack of entries.

Final results

References 

Singapore Open (badminton)
1935 in badminton